Serapis is a Greco-Egyptian god.

Serapis may also refer to:

 , various British ships
 , several US ships
 Serapis Bey, in Theosophy the Ascended Master in charge of the Ascension Temple